An Immense World: How Animal Senses Reveal the Hidden Realms Around Us is a 2022 book by Ed Yong that examines animal senses. The book has two "positive" reviews and eleven "rave" reviews, according to review aggregator Book Marks.

The book has been longlisted for the 2023 Andrew Carnegie Medal for Excellence in Nonfiction. It was selected for The New York Timess "10 Best Books of 2022" list.

References

2022 non-fiction books
English-language books
Random House books